was a Japanese freestyle swimmer who competed in the 1924 Summer Olympics. He was born in Shizuoka. In 1924 Onoda was eliminated in the first round of the 100 metre freestyle event as well as of the 1500 metre freestyle competition. He was also a member of the Japanese relay team which finished fourth in the 4 × 200 metre freestyle relay event.

References

External links
Kazuo Onoda's profile at Sports Reference.com

Olympic swimmers of Japan
Swimmers at the 1924 Summer Olympics
1900 births
1983 deaths
Japanese male freestyle swimmers
20th-century Japanese people